Dame Alice Josephine Mary Taylor Barnes,  (18 August 1912 – 28 December 1999), known professionally as Dr Josephine Barnes, was a leading English obstetrician and gynaecologist. She was the first female president of the British Medical Association, 1979. Barnes was also active in the Women's National Cancer Control Campaign with cancer screening.

Early life and education 
She was born on 18 August 1912, the eldest of five children of Methodist minister Walter Wharton Barnes and Alice Mary, née Ibbotson. She was born at Cliff Road, Sheringham, Norfolk and educated at Oxford High School in North Oxford and the University of Oxford, reading Natural Sciences at Lady Margaret Hall. She then studied medicine at University College London.

Career
When the Second World War started, she was appointed to a post at the Samaritan Hospital. From 1947 she ran a mobile obstetric team from University College Hospital. Barnes was the first woman consultant obstetrician and gynaecologist at Charing Cross Hospital (1954) and the first woman President of the British Medical Association (1979–80).

She was also Chairman of the Elizabeth Garrett Anderson Hospital Appeal Trust, President of the Association of Chartered Physiotherapists in Obstetrics and Gynaecology (known since 1994 as the Association of Chartered Physiotherapists in Women's Health) from 1977 to 1995, and President of the Royal British Nurses' Association. She took a prominent role in the public debate over the 1967 Abortion Act.

In 1988, she became president of the Osler Club of London. In 1994, she delivered the Hunterian Oration at the Hunterian Society. Between 1995 and 1996, Barnes was president of the History of Medicine Society at the Royal Society of Medicine. She was a Fellow of the Royal College of Physicians, the Royal College of Surgeons of England, and the Royal College of Obstetricians and Gynaecologists (of which she was at one time Vice-President).

Marriage

She married Brian Warren, a lieutenant in the Army, in 1942.

Other
She was a Friend of the English Pocket Opera Company and a Guardian of Westminster Abbey.

References

External links 
 Listen to an oral history interview with Dame Josephine Barnes – a life story interview recorded for National Life Stories at the British Library
 – an oral history interview recorded by Oxford Brookes University in partnership with the Royal College of Physicians as part of the Medical Sciences Video Archive

1912 births
1999 deaths
Alumni of Lady Margaret Hall, Oxford
Alumni of University College London
English gynaecologists
English obstetricians
English women medical doctors
Dames Commander of the Order of the British Empire
People from Oxford
People from Sheringham
People educated at Oxford High School, England
Fellows of King's College London
20th-century English medical doctors
Presidents of the British Medical Association
Presidents of the Medical Women's Federation
Presidents of the History of Medicine Society
20th-century women physicians
Presidents of the Osler Club of London
20th-century English women
20th-century English people
Wives of knights